Mali Dol is a small settlement in the Slovene Hills in northeastern Slovenia. It lies in the Municipality of Pesnica, part of the traditional region of Styria. The municipality is now included in the Drava Statistical Region.

References

External links
Mali Dol on Geopedia

Populated places in the Municipality of Pesnica